Azzini is an Italian surname. Notable people with the surname include:

Carlo Azzini (1935–2020), Italian cyclist
Ernesto Azzini (1885–1923), Italian cyclist
Giovanni Azzini (1929–1994), Italian footballer
Giuseppe Azzini (1891–1925), Italian cyclist

Italian-language surnames